Samson (HWV 57) is a three-act oratorio by George Frideric Handel, considered one of his finest dramatic works. It is usually performed as an oratorio in concert form, but on occasions has also been staged as an opera. The well-known arias "Let the bright Seraphim" (for soprano), "Total eclipse" (for tenor) and "Let their celestial concerts" (the final chorus) are often performed separately in concert.

Background and composition

The German-born Handel had been resident in London since 1712 and had there enjoyed great success as a composer of Italian operas. His opportunities to set English texts to music had been more limited. He had spent the years 1717 to 1719 as composer in residence to the wealthy Duke of Chandos, where he had written church anthems and two stage works, Acis and Galatea and Esther. He had composed vocal music to English words for various royal occasions, including a set of Coronation anthems for George II in 1727, which had made a huge impact. In 1731, a performance of the 1718 version of Esther, a work in English based on a Biblical drama by Jean Racine, was given in London without Handel's participation and had proved popular. He thus revised the work and planned to present it at the theatre where his Italian operas were being presented. However, the Bishop of London would not permit a drama based on a Biblical story to be acted out on the stage; Handel therefore presented Esther in concert form, thus giving birth to the English oratorio.

Esther in its revised form proved a popular work, and Handel, though still continuing to focus on composition of Italian operas, followed it with two more sacred dramas with English words to be presented in concert form, Deborah, and Athalia (which, like Esther, was also based on a Biblical drama by Racine), both in 1733.
Such was the success of his oratorios in English that eventually Handel abandoned Italian opera, his last being Deidamia in 1741, and produced a string of masterpieces of oratorio in English.

Handel began the composition of Samson immediately after completing Messiah on 14 September 1741. It uses a libretto by Newburgh Hamilton, who based it on Milton's Samson Agonistes, which in turn was based on the figure Samson in Chapter 16 of the Book of Judges. Handel completed the first act on 20 September 1741, the second act on 11 October that year, and the whole work on 29 October. Shortly after that he travelled to Dublin to put on the premiere of Messiah, returning to London at the end of August 1742 and thoroughly revising Samson.

The premiere was given at Covent Garden in London on 18 February 1743, with the incidental organ music probably the recently completed concerto in A major  (HWV 307).  The oratorio was a great success, leading to a total of seven performances in its first season, the most in a single season of any of his oratorios. Samson retained its popularity throughout Handel's lifetime and has never fallen entirely out of favor since.

Premiere cast

Synopsis

Samson, Judge of Israel, married a Philistine woman, Dalila, who discovered that his supernatural strength derived from his never cutting his hair. Dalila shore his hair while he was sleeping and betrayed him to her people, the Philistines, enemy of the Israelites. The Philistines captured Samson and put his eyes out. The scene is set in front of the prison in Gaza. Since it is a festival day in honour of the Philistine god Dagon Samson is allowed to come out of his prison cell, albeit in chains, and receive visitors.

Act 1

The Philistines celebrate the holiday in honour of their god as Samson, blind and in chains, bewails his fate.
Samson's friend Micah, allowed to visit on this special day, is appalled by how low their once invincible hero has fallen, seeing in Samson's humiliation a symbol of Israel's defeat, but Samson insists it is all his own fault for having been unable to keep the secret of his magical strength from the woman who betrayed him. Samson bitterly laments his loss of sight.

Samson's father Manoah finds Samson and is shocked by his transformation. Samson longs for death, but is comforted by the Chorus of Israelites that he will triumph over death and time.

Act 2
Micah and the Israelites implore divine assistance as Samson still wishes to die. Dalila, with a group of young women, appears and tells Samson she is sorry for what she did and that she did not realise how serious the consequences would be. She attempts to convince him that she still loves him, but he angrily repudiates her.

The Philistine Harapha comes to insult Samson, who challenges him to a duel. Harapha, however, reviles Samson, claiming it is beneath his dignity to fight with a blind man. Samson mocks him as a braggart. Micah proposes to measure the power of Dagon against that of the god of the Israelites. The Israelite and Philistine choruses both praise their God.

Act 3
Harapha arrives to take Samson to the feast of the Philistines and show him off there. Samson at first refuses to be present at the worship of Dagon, but then thinks of a plan and agrees to go to the festival, though he warns the Israelites to stay away from it.

Manoah arrives with plans for the children of Israel, including how to free Samson. From a distance are heard the songs of the Philistines, calling on Dagon. Suddenly these sounds turn to noise and panic.

An Israelite messenger arrives and tells the Israelites what has happened: Samson pulled down the building on himself and the Philistines. Samson's dead body is brought out to a funeral march and the children of Israel lament his death. The work ends on a note of thanksgiving as the Israelites praise their God.

Musical features

Samson is richly orchestrated by the standards of its day, calling for strings, two oboes, two bassoons, two horns, two flutes, two trumpets, timpani and continuo instruments.
Handel's characterisation through music is much in evidence throughout the work, not only in the music for soloists such as Dalila's would-be seductive aria with alluring violins or in the swagger of Harapha's music, but also in the choruses, with the solemn gravity of the Israelites' music sharply contrasted with the hedonistic carefree choruses with added horns for the Philistines.

Recordings

Bibliography
 Winton Dean: Handel's Dramatic Oratorios and Masques. Clarendon, Oxford 1989, (Originalausgabe: Oxford University Press, Oxford 1959)
  Hans Joachim Marx: Händels Oratorien, Oden und Serenaten. Ein Kompendium. Vandenhoeck & Ruprecht, Göttingen 1998, .
  Albert Scheibler, Julia Evdokimova: Georg Friedrich Händel. Oratorien-Führer. Edition Köln, Lohmar 1993, .

References

External links
 
 Full-text libretto online
 Score of Samson (ed. Friedrich Chrysander, Leipzig 1861)

Oratorios by George Frideric Handel
Samson
1741 compositions
Oratorios based on the Bible